The Kinston and Snow Hill Railroad is a short-line railroad in Kinston, North Carolina. The railroad operates a  industrial spur from a junction with the Norfolk Southern Railway to the Global TransPark. The company is a wholly owned subsidiary of Gulf and Ohio Railways. It is named for a railroad of the same name which operated the same route from 1903 to 1913. The railroad owns a single EMD SW900 locomotive, former Lancaster and Chester #90.

In August of 2022, Gulf & Ohio chose not to renew the lease to operate this railroad and Jaguar Transport Holdings acquired leasehold rights to the track owned by the N.C. Department of Transportation (NCDOT). The railroad's new name is simply Kinston Railroad. The SW900 remains on property.

References 

Railway companies established in 2016
Gulf and Ohio Railways
North Carolina railroads
Standard gauge railways in the United States
American companies established in 2016